Sir Lewis Edward Harris  (25 March 1900 – 6 March 1983) was a New Zealand farmer, stock dealer and philanthropist. He was born in Woodville, New Zealand, on 25 March 1900.

In the 1960 Queen's Birthday Honours, Harris was appointed an Officer of the Order of the British Empire, for philanthropic and social welfare services, especially in the interests of handicapped children. He was made a Knight Bachelor, for services to handicapped people, in the 1979 Queen's Birthday Honours.

References

1900 births
1983 deaths
New Zealand farmers
New Zealand philanthropists
People from Woodville, New Zealand
New Zealand Officers of the Order of the British Empire
New Zealand Knights Bachelor
20th-century philanthropists